This is a list of episodes from the first season of Barney Miller.

Broadcast history
The season originally aired Thursdays at 8:00-8:30 pm (EST).

Episodes

References

1975 American television seasons
Barney Miller seasons